Visitors to Nigeria require a visa unless they come from one of the visa exempt countries. All visitors must hold a passport valid for 6 months.

Visa policy map

Visa policy 

Citizens of the following 17 countries can visit Nigeria without a visa:

Visa is also not required for former nationals of Nigeria holding a valid foreign passport together with expired Nigerian passport.

Nationals of  can obtain a visa on arrival for a maximum stay of 90 days.

Holders of diplomatic or service category passports issued to nationals of Brazil, China, Namibia and South Africa do not require a visa for Nigeria and holders of diplomatic passports issued to nationals of Turkey. Visa exemption agreement for holders of diplomatic and official passports was signed with Vietnam in October 2019 and it is yet to be ratified.
Nationals of China holding passports for public affairs do not require a visa for a maximum stay of 30 days.

Holders of written e-Visa approval issued by Immigration Authority Headquarters in Abuja, can obtain a visa on arrival, provided holding a visa application form and e-Visa application payment receipt and holding an invitation letter from Nigerian company accepting immigration responsibilities.

Visa On Arrival

In November 2019 President of Nigeria announced that visas on arrival would be granted to all African travelers starting from January 2020.

See also

Visa requirements for Nigerian citizens
Tourism in Nigeria

References

Nigeria